Armiger is a person entitled to use a heraldic achievement.

Armiger may also refer to:

People
Katie Armiger (born 1991), American country music singer
Martin Armiger (1949–2019), Australian musician, member of the rock band The Sports

Places 
Armigers, Essex, a village in Essex, England

Other uses
AGM Armiger, anti-radiation missile
Armiger (horse), Thoroughbred racehorse